Pyrgotis plagiatana is a species of moth of the family Tortricidae. It is found in New Zealand.

The wingspan is about 18 mm. It is a variable species, differing much in the intensity of colouring. The forewings are whitish, suffused with pale ochreous, becoming darker towards the inner margin. The hindwings are whitish, faintly tinged with ochreous at the apex and spotted with grey.

The larvae are polyphagous, webbing together and feeding on the leaves and cladodes of various trees and shrubs, including Carmichaelia species, Coriaria arborea, Fuchsia excorticata, Veronica elliptica, Veronica stricta, Veronica subalpina, Melicope simplex, Metrosideros species, Ozothamnus leptophyllus, Pittosporum tenuifolium, Tupeia antarctica, Pinus radiata and Ulex europaeus.

References

External links

 Citizen Science observations of P. plagiatana.

Moths described in 1863
Archipini
Moths of New Zealand
Endemic fauna of New Zealand
Taxa named by Francis Walker (entomologist)
Endemic moths of New Zealand